Batrachedra comosae is a moth in the family Batrachedridae. It is found on Puerto Rico. The larvae have been recorded feeding on Ananas comosus.

References

Natural History Museum Lepidoptera generic names catalog

Batrachedridae
Moths described in 1966